The 1977 FIBA Africa Championship for Women was the 5th FIBA Africa Championship for Women, played under the rules of FIBA, the world governing body for basketball, and the FIBA Africa thereof. The tournament was hosted by Senegal from December 25, 1976, to January 4, 1977.

Senegal defeated Egypt 88–56 in the final.

Draw

Preliminary round

Group A

Group B

Knockout stage

Semifinals

7th place match

5th place match

Bronze medal match

Final

Final standings

Awards

External links
Official Website

References

1977
Bask
1977 in women's basketball
1977 in African basketball
International women's basketball competitions hosted by Senegal